Richard Mark Erenberg (born April 17, 1962) is a former professional American football running back in the National Football League. He played three seasons for the Pittsburgh Steelers. As of 2009, he was tied for the most kickoff returns in a single game by a Steeler with 7 on September 2, 1984. He currently resides in Peters Township, Pennsylvania.

Early life
Erenberg graduated from Horace Greeley High School in 1980.

References 

1962 births
Living people
People from Chappaqua, New York
Players of American football from New York (state)
American football running backs
Colgate Raiders football players
Pittsburgh Steelers players
Horace Greeley High School alumni